Roxana Oana Andrei (born 14 June 1987) is Romanian model and beauty pageant titleholder who was crowned Miss Universe Romania 2013 and represented her country at the Miss Universe 2013 pageant in Moscow.

Early life
Till she was crowned as Miss Universe Romania 2013, Roxana Oana Andrei worked as an international model in Milan.

Miss Universe Romania 2013
Roxana Oana Andrei was crowned Miss Universe Romania 2013 at the conclusion of the pageant held on 14 September  2013 at TVR Studios in Bucharest. The beauty from Târgoviște was represented Romania in the Miss Universe 2013 pageant in Moscow, Russia.

References

External links
 Official Miss Romania website

Living people
Romanian beauty pageant winners
Miss Universe 2013 contestants
1987 births
People from Targovishte